The O2 Silver Clef Awards is an annual UK music awards lunch which has been running since 1976.

History
The Silver Clef fundraising committee was founded in 1976 by musicians and managers from across the British music industry, who wanted to honour and award music artists whilst raising funds for Nordoff Robbins. The event went on to become the annual Silver Clef Awards and Lunch, an important date in the social and business calendar of the music industry, with even members of the Royal Family attending as guests of honour. The Silver Clef initiative eventually expanded to the USA, where members of the music community there arranged the first American Silver Clef Award Dinner and Auction in 1989. The funds from that event benefited the Nordoff Robbins Centre for Music Therapy based at New York University.

The 44th annual event was held in July 2019 at the Grosvenor House Hotel in London, honouring music greats including Ed Sheeran, Sam Smith and Dua Lipa, and raised £835,000.

Personnel
Committee Chair: Emma Banks

Categories
Silver Clef Award (for outstanding contribution to UK music)
Outstanding Achievement Award
Icon Award
International Award
Best Newcomer Award
Best Group Award
Best Female Award
Best Male Award
Classical Award
Innovation Award
Best Live Act

List of winners
Silver Clef Award

1976 The Who
1977 Genesis
1978 Cliff Richard and the Shadows
1979 Elton John
1980 Pink Floyd
1981 Status Quo
1982 The Rolling Stones
1983 Eric Clapton
1984 Queen
1985 Dire Straits
1986 Phil Collins
1987 David Bowie
1988 Paul McCartney
1989 George Michael
1990 Robert Plant
1991 Rod Stewart
1992 Def Leppard
1993 Eric Clapton
1994 Sting
1995 Take That
1996 Wet Wet Wet
1997 Elvis Costello
1998 Jamiroquai
1999 M People
2000 Eurythmics
2001 Tom Jones
2002 Dido
2003 Coldplay
2004 Morrissey
2005 The Who (30th Anniversary Award)
2006 Ozzy Osbourne & Sharon Osbourne
2007 Paul Weller
2008 Oasis
2009 Take That
2010 Muse
2011 Annie Lennox
2012 Kylie Minogue (25th Anniversary Award)
2013 The Clash
2014 Jimmy Page
2015 Iron Maiden
2016 Lionel Richie
2017 Dame Shirley Bassey
2018 Roger Waters
2019 Ed Sheeran

Outstanding Achievement Award

2005 U2
2006 The Eagles
2007 Clive Robbins 
2010 Tony Bennett
2011 Status Quo
2012 Andrew Lloyd Webber
2013 Barry Gibb
2014 Sir Tom Jones
2015 Duran Duran
2016 Patti Smith
2017 Blondie
2018 Robert Plant

Best Newcomer Award

1986 Curiosity Killed the Cat
1987 Pet Shop Boys
1988 Wet Wet Wet
1989 Fairground Attraction
1990 Lisa Stansfield
1991 James
1992 Right Said Fred
1993 Take That
1994 Dina Carroll
1995 Eternal
1996 Supergrass
1997 Kula Shaker
1998 Robbie Williams
1999 Another Level
2000 Five
2001 Craig David
2002 Blue
2003 Ms Dynamite
2004 Jamie Cullum
2005 Razorlight
2005 McFly 
2006 Editors
2007 Paolo Nutini
2008 Amy Macdonald
2009 La Roux
2010 JLS
2011 Tinie Tempah
2012 Conor Maynard
2013 Jessie Ware
2014 Laura Mvula
2015 James Bay
2016 Jess Glynne
2017 Anne-Marie
2018 Jorja Smith
2019 Mabel (singer)

International Award

1992 INXS
1993 U2
1994 Jimmy Page & Robert Plant
1995 Bryan Adams
1996 AC/DC
1997 Vanessa Mae
1998 Chris de Burgh
1999 The Corrs
2000 Ronan Keating
2001 Kylie Minogue
2002 Natalie Imbruglia
2003 Bon Jovi
2004 George Benson
2005 Bob Geldof
2006 Foo Fighters
2007 John Legend
2008 Meat Loaf
2009 Brian Wilson
2010 Kelis
2011 Swedish House Mafia
2012 Michael Bublé
2013 Vampire Weekend
2014 Pharrell Williams
2015 Gladys Knight
2016 Hozier
2017 Nile Rodgers
2018 The Script
2019 The Black Eyed Peas

 
Classical Award

2005 Katherine Jenkins
2007 Andrea Bocelli
2008 Nicola Benedetti
2009 Faryl Smith
2010 Russell Watson
2011 Alfie Boe
2012 Laura Wright
2013 Alison Balsom
2014 Gareth Malone
2015 Il Divo
2016 André Rieu
2017 Alexander Armstrong
2018 Alfie Boe & Michael Ball
2019 Sheku Kanneh-Mason

Icon Award

1998 Sir Cliff Richard
1999 Madness
2007 Rod Stewart
2008 Squeeze
2009 Madness
2010 Dame Vera Lynn
2011 Liza Minnelli
2012 Fatboy Slim
2013 Alison Moyet
2014 Chas & Dave
2015 Primal Scream
2016 Jeff Lynne
2017 Phil Collins
2018 Stereophonics

Best Female Award
2015 Rita Ora
2016 Florence Welch
2017 Emeli Sande
2018 Ellie Goulding
2019 Dua Lipa

Best Male Award
2015 Jake Bugg
2016 Olly Murs
2018 George Ezra
2019 Sam Smith

Best Group
2015 Kasabian 
2016 Massive Attack
2017 Mumford & Sons
2018 Bastille
2019 Years and Years

Innovation Award

2008 Estelle
2009 N-Dubz
2010 Dizzee Rascal
2011 McFly
2012 Emeli Sandé
2013 Labrinth
2014 Giorgio Moroder
2015 Mark Ronson
2016 Craig David
2017 Pete Tong
2018 Rudimental
2019 The Chemical Brothers

Best Live Act (voted for by the public)
2011 Sir Paul McCartney
2012 McFly
2013 One Direction
2014 Justin Timberlake
2015 Arctic Monkeys 
2017 Little Mix 
2018 Harry Styles
 
Ambassadors of Rock Award
2007 Bryan Ferry
2008 Bryan Adams
2009 Queen
2010 Slash
2011 Arcade Fire
2012 Manic Street Preachers
2013 Ray Davies
2014 Black Sabbath
 
Best British Act Award
2006 Kaiser Chiefs
2007 Snow Patrol
2008 The Fratellis
2009 Stereophonics
2010 Scouting For Girls
2011 Biffy Clyro
2012 Jessie J
2013 Coldplay
2014 Paloma Faith

World Peace Award
1997 John Lennon (posthumous)

Special Achievement Award

1992 Alan Freeman
1993 The Bee Gees
1995 George Martin
1997 Chris Barber
1998 Deep Purple
1999 Pete King
2000 Burt Bacharach & Hal David
2001 Leiber & Stoller
2002 Lulu
2003 Ray Davies
2004 Iron Maiden
2005 The Who
2006 Gary Farrow

Heart Record/ Artist of the Year Award
2003 Atomic Kitten
2004 Will Young
2005 Lemar (male)
2005 Natasha Bedingfield (female)
2006 Girls Aloud
2007 The Feeling

See also
Knebworth Festival (1990 Silver Clef Award Winners show)

References

External links
Nordoff Robbins Silver Clef Awards

British music awards
1976 establishments in the United Kingdom
Awards established in 1976